The second season of Battle of the Blades premiered on September 26, 2010, as a part of CBC's fall line-up. Like season 1, this season showcased a lineup of eight couples.

Ron MacLean and Kurt Browning return as the show's hosts. Sandra Bezic continued as the head judge this season, with the addition of former NHL player Jeremy Roenick as the other regular judge, replacing season 1's Dick Button.  This season  continued to have one rotating guest judge every week.  Because Maple Leaf Gardens was undergoing renovations at the time, the venue this season was set in a sound stage at Pinewood Toronto Studios.  The sound stage was transformed into a skating rink, with two-tiered seating.

The elimination format changed this season.  The scores from the couples' Sunday night performance were now added to the viewers voting to determine the bottom two couples.  On Monday, the bottom two couples are revealed and they skate their Sunday night program once more in the Skate-Off.  Instead of scoring the couples on their Skate-Off performance, this season the judges were just asked to vote on the couple of their choice.  The couple with the fewest judges' votes was then eliminated.  However, it was announced that the judges would not be scoring the couples' week eight skates and that the top three placements were decided solely on viewers voting.

The official cast announcement was made on the morning of September 7, 2010 on the show's official website.

The season premiere on September 26, 2010, was actually a preview of the competition, entitled "Battle of the Blades: Game On".  It documented the announcement of the cast, training camp and partner assignments of the eight couples.  The first actual competition night was broadcast live on Sunday, October 3, 2010.

On October 25, 2010, it was announced that there would be a special show on October 31, 2010, entitled "Second Chance Sunday" in which the four previously eliminated pairs would gain a second chance to go back to the competition.

Couples

Scoring Chart
Red numbers indicate the couples with the lowest score for each week.
Green numbers indicate the couples with the highest score for each week.
 indicates the couple (or couples) eliminated that week.
 indicates the returning couple that finished in the bottom two.
 indicates the eliminated couple that finished in the top two couples in the Second Chance competition.
 indicates the Top 4 couples not needing to compete in the Second Chance competition.
 indicates the winning couple.
 indicates the runner-up couple.
 indicates the third-place couple.

Notes
a ^ Skates in Week 8 were not scored by the judges.

Skate-Off Chart

Average chart

Weekly themes and guest judges

Individual scores & songs

Week 1
Individual judges scores in charts below (given in parentheses) are listed in this order from left to right:  Brett Hull, Sandra Bezic, Jeremy Roenick.
Running order

Week 2
Individual judges scores in charts below (given in parentheses) are listed in this order from left to right:  Marie-France Dubreuil, Sandra Bezic, Jeremy Roenick.
Running order

Week 3
Individual judges scores in charts below (given in parentheses) are listed in this order from left to right:  Ken Daneyko, Sandra Bezic, Jeremy Roenick.
Running order

Week 4
Individual judges scores in charts below (given in parentheses) are listed in this order from left to right:  Scott Hamilton, Sandra Bezic, Jeremy Roenick.
Running order

Week 5
Individual judges scores in charts below (given in parentheses) are listed in this order from left to right:  Curtis Joseph, Sandra Bezic, Jeremy Roenick.
Running order

Notes
a ^ Jeremy Roenick had originally given Patrice & Shae-Lynn a score of 5.9, but opted to change it to a perfect 6.0 upon hearing Sandra Bezic had given them the perfect score.  CBC did not have time to change the score initially and the on-screen graphic still displayed Roenick's given score at 5.9, giving the couple a total of 17.7.  When the judges' leaderboard was announced at the end of the night, the graphic was corrected to reflect the new score.

Week 6
Individual judges scores in charts below (given in parentheses) are listed in this order from left to right:  Toller Cranston, Sandra Bezic, Jeremy Roenick.
Running order

Week 7
Individual judges scores in charts below (given in parentheses) are listed in this order from left to right:  Don Cherry, Sandra Bezic, Jeremy Roenick.
Running order

Week 8
None of the skates in week 8 were scored.
Running order

Weekly ratings
Weekly ratings and rankings are measured by BBM Canada, an audience measurement organization for Canadian television and radio broadcasting.

References

External links
 Official website of Battle of the Blades

Season 02
2010 Canadian television seasons